Veronika Vladimirovna Nikitina (born 16 May 1992) is a Russian female handballer for Handball Club Lada and the Russian national team. 

She participated at the 2021 World Women's Handball Championship in Spain.

References

External links

1992 births
Living people
Sportspeople from Tolyatti
Russian female handball players